Saint-Victor-l'Abbaye is a commune in the Seine-Maritime department in the Normandy region in north-western France.

Geography
SNCF railways have a TER station here, connecting with Rouen and Dieppe.

Population

Places of interest
 The châteaux of St. Victor and Ménillet.
 Traces of a feudal castle.
 The church of St. Victor, dating from the thirteenth century.

See also
Communes of the Seine-Maritime department

References

Communes of Seine-Maritime